David M. Hale (born June 18, 1981) is an American former professional ice hockey player. He played for the New Jersey Devils, Calgary Flames, Phoenix Coyotes, Tampa Bay Lightning and Ottawa Senators over an eight-year National Hockey League (NHL) career. Hale is noteworthy for holding the record for most games needed to score his first NHL goal, with it taking him 231 games, scoring it in his 6th professional season.

Playing career
Hale, a Colorado Springs native, played high school hockey for Coronado High School before joining Sioux City Musketeers of the USHL. He was drafted from the Musketeers in the first round, 22nd overall by the New Jersey Devils in the 2000 NHL Entry Draft before joining the University of North Dakota to play collegiate hockey in the Western Collegiate Hockey Association.

Hale made his NHL debut on October 8, 2003.

On February 27, 2007, Hale was traded by the Devils, along with a 2007 fifth-round draft pick, to the Calgary Flames for a 2007 third-round draft pick.

On July 3, 2008, Hale, a free agent, signed with the Phoenix Coyotes on a two-year deal. During the 2008–09 season on November 26, 2008, Hale scored his first NHL goal in a 3–2 victory against the Columbus Blue Jackets. Hale scored in his 231st game, setting a record for the longest start to a NHL career without a goal.

On July 21, 2009, Hale was traded by the Coyotes, along with Todd Fedoruk, to the Tampa Bay Lightning for Radim Vrbata. Used as a depth defenseman Hale played sparingly in 35 games, before he was reassigned to AHL affiliate, the Norfolk Admirals, on a conditioning assignment. In his last game with the Admirals, Hale broke his foot and returned to Tampa to play in just 4 more games to end the 2009–10 season.

On August 4, 2010, Hale signed a one-year contract with the Ottawa Senators. Hale split the season between Ottawa and their AHL team, the Binghamton Senators. Hale finished the season with Ottawa, and did not take part in Binghamton's Calder Cup playoff run.

On October 15, 2011, Hale officially announced his retirement from hockey.

On June 26, 2013, Hale signed with Italian team HC Appiano, in the semi-pro Inter-National League.

Career statistics

Regular season and playoffs

International

Awards and honors

References

External links

1981 births
Living people
Albany River Rats players
American men's ice hockey defensemen
Binghamton Senators players
Calgary Flames players
Ice hockey players from Colorado
Lowell Devils players
National Hockey League first-round draft picks
New Jersey Devils draft picks
New Jersey Devils players
Norfolk Admirals players
Ottawa Senators players
Phoenix Coyotes players
Sioux City Musketeers players
Sportspeople from Colorado Springs, Colorado
Tampa Bay Lightning players
North Dakota Fighting Hawks men's ice hockey players